CHY FM is a youth-run community radio station located in Coffs Harbour, New South Wales.

History
The idea of a youth-run community radio station in Coffs Harbour came from Captain John Townsend, a member of the Salvation Army. Townsend realised the success this concept could be. After donations from businesses from across Coffs Harbour, the station launched on 1 December 1973. Since 1973, more than 4000 young people from the Coffs Harbour region have been through CHY FM. The station celebrated its 40th anniversary in 2013.

References

Community radio stations in Australia
Radio stations in New South Wales
Radio stations established in 1973
Coffs Harbour